Ismail Morina (born 1 April 1990) is a Kosovar-Albanian footballer, who currently plays for German amateur side TSV Wörth/Donau.

Football career

Club career
He has previously played in the German Lower Leagues for a variety of different clubs.

Personal life
 His brother is footballer Petrit Morina.
 His cousins are footballers Alban Morina, Arber Morina, Fisnik Morina & Hasan Morina.

References

External links

1990 births
Living people
People from Kaçanik
Kosovan emigrants to Germany
Kosovan footballers
Association football forwards
3. Liga players
SSV Jahn Regensburg players
Bahlinger SC players
SV Seligenporten players
Kosovan expatriate footballers
Expatriate footballers in Germany
Kosovan expatriate sportspeople in Germany